Alan Mahood (born 26 March 1973) is a Scottish former professional footballer who played for numerous clubs including: Greenock Morton, Kilmarnock, Ross County and St Johnstone.

External links

Living people
1973 births
Scottish footballers
Greenock Morton F.C. players
Nottingham Forest F.C. players
Kilmarnock F.C. players
Ross County F.C. players
St Johnstone F.C. players
Scottish Premier League players
Association football midfielders
Scottish Football League players
People from Kilwinning
Footballers from North Ayrshire
Queen's Park F.C. non-playing staff